Waradgery County is one of the 141 Cadastral divisions of New South Wales. It contains the town of Hay. It includes the area between the Lachlan River and the Murrumbidgee River where they meet. The Lachlan River is the northern boundary of the county, and the Murrumbidgee for a small section is the southern boundary, but the county also includes some of the land to the south of the Murrumbidgee near Hay.

The name Waradgery is believed to be derived from a local Aboriginal word (probably in relation to the Wiradjuri people.

Parishes within this county

A full list of parishes found within this county; their current LGA and mapping coordinates to the approximate centre of each location is as follows:

References

Counties of New South Wales